Thomas K. Berg (born February 10, 1940) was an American lawyer and politician.

Berg was born in Willmar, Kandiyohi County, Minnesota. He received his bachelor's degree from University of Minnesota and his law degree from University of Minnesota Law School. Berg served in the United States Navy. Berg lived in Minneapolis, Minnesota with his wife and family and practiced law in Minneapolis. Berg served in the Minnesota House of Representatives from 1971 to 1978 and was a Democrat.

References

1940 births
Living people
Lawyers from Minneapolis
Politicians from Minneapolis
People from Willmar, Minnesota
Military personnel from Minnesota
University of Minnesota alumni
University of Minnesota Law School alumni
Democratic Party members of the Minnesota House of Representatives